The following lists events that happened during 2000 in Spain.

Incumbents
 Monarch: Juan Carlos I
 Prime Minister: José María Aznar

Events

Arts and entertainment

Sports

Births

 September 9: Victoria de Marichalar y Borbón, daughter of the Duchess of Lugo, The Infanta Elena of Spain and Jaime de Marichalar.

Deaths

5 February – José García Hernández (born 1915), politician
6 June – Andrés Reguera (born 1930), politician

See also
 2000 in Spanish television
 List of Spanish films of 2000

References

 
Spain
Years of the 20th century in Spain
Spain
2000s in Spain